Irwell Vale railway station is a station built as part of the East Lancashire Railway. It serves the small village of Irwell Vale in Lancashire.

History

Irwell Vale was built by the East Lancashire Railway in connection with the local authority. The platform edging stones of the station are originally from Bradley Fold station, on the now abandoned Bury to Bolton line. The former Bradley Fold station long since demolished.

Railway station information
The station has its own parking facilities. Next to it is a level crossing providing access to houses on the nearby Hardsough Road. The crossing features the original warning sign, listing a telephone number with an area code prior to the Phone Day introduction of the "01" prefix.

Access on foot is effected by a small subway.

Services

Heritage railway stations in the Borough of Rossendale
Railway stations in Great Britain opened in 1991
1991 establishments in England
Railway stations built for UK heritage railways